Eisenhorn is a trilogy of science fantasy / crime novels by the British writer Dan Abnett, set in the fictional universe of the Warhammer 40,000 tabletop game.

Eisenhorn is the first in a series of trilogies and separate novels by Abnett, which are some of the most popular works of Warhammer 40,000 tie-in fiction. The series follows the inquisitors Gregor Eisenhorn and Gideon Ravenor and their retinue as they hunt heretics and demons, while attempting not to succumb to Chaos – the archenemy of mankind in the setting – in the process. Eisenhorn has been adapted as a video game, and is set to be adapted as a television series.

Books

The Eisenhorn series includes:
 Eisenhorn (omnibus, 768 pages, 2004):
 Xenos (2001)
 Malleus (2001)
 Hereticus (2002)
 Ravenor: The Omnibus (omnibus, 768 pages, 2009)
 Ravenor (hardcover, 2004, paperback, 2005)
 Thorn Wishes Talon (ebook, 2004)
 Ravenor Returned (hardcover, 2005, paperback, 2006)
 Ravenor Rogue (2007, hardcover)
 Bequin 
 Pariah: Ravenor Versus Eisenhorn (2012)
 Penitent (2021)
 Pandaemonium (forthcoming)
The Magos (720 pages, 8 March 2018)
Includes The Definitive Casebook of Gregor Eisenhorn, a prequel short story compilation

Adaptations

Video game

Eisenhorn: Xenos is a third-person action-adventure game by Pixel Hero Games. It adapts Xenos, the first book of the Eisenhorn trilogy. It was released on Steam for PC on 10 August 2016, and received mixed reviews.

TV series
In July 2019, the producer Frank Spotnitz announced that he was developing a TV adaptation of the Eisenhorn series as the showrunner, together with Emily Feller as an executive producer. A broadcaster or platform, cast and staff have not yet been made public.

References

Warhammer 40,000 novels
Novels by Dan Abnett